Hans Nogler (28 February 1919, in Vienna, Austria – 30 May 2011, in Sëlva, Italy) was an Austrian alpine skier who competed in the 1948 Winter Olympics.

In 1948 he finished eighth in the alpine skiing combined competition and ninth in the alpine skiing downhill event.

References

External links

Alpine skiing 1948 
Hans Nogler's profile at Sports Reference.com

1919 births
2011 deaths
Austrian male alpine skiers
Olympic alpine skiers of Austria
Alpine skiers at the 1948 Winter Olympics
Disease-related deaths in Trentino-Alto Adige/Südtirol
Sportspeople from Vienna